Zirdan may refer to:
 Zirdan, Iranshahr
 Zirdan, Nik Shahr